Stenoptilodes altiaustralis is a moth of the family Pterophoridae that is known from Peru.

Adults are on wing in March and August.

Etymology
The name reflects the high altitude and southern latitude at which the species occurs.

External links

altiaustralis
Moths described in 2006
Endemic fauna of Peru
Moths of South America
Taxa named by Cees Gielis